PremiAir Racing is an Australian motor racing team competing in ANDRA Top Fuel and the Supercars Championship. The team is owned by Peter Xiberras, the managing director of PremiAir Hire and himself a Top Fuel drag racing champion.

History

Top Fuel
PremiAir Racing has competed in ANDRA Top Fuel events since 2014.

Supercars
In January 2022, PremiAir Racing bought Tekno Autosports' Supercars Championship team, six weeks prior to the 2022 Supercars Championship's scheduled commencement date at Sydney Motorsport Park. Tekno, branded as Team Sydney since 2020, had competed in the series since 2011 as an independent team. On the 21st of June 2022, PremiAir Racing terminated the contract of Garry Jacobson effective immediately after the Darwin Triple Crown. On July 5, it was announced that James Golding would replace Jacobson for the remainder of the season. 

On October 14th, PremiAir confirmed the departure of Chris Pither at the end of the 2022 season.  A week later PremiAir revealed that Tim Slade would be signing on to the team for the 2023 season, replacing Chris Pither.  Later, PremiAir confirmed that James Golding would continue with the team for the 2023 season.

Results

Car No. 22 results

Car No. 31 results

Race Drivers 

 Chris Pither (2022)
 Garry Jacobson (2022)
 James Golding (2022 - Present)
 Dylan O'Keeffe (2022)
 Cameron Hill (2022)
 Tim Slade (2023)

References

Australian auto racing teams
Sports teams in Queensland
Supercars Championship teams
2022 establishments in Australia
Auto racing teams established in 2022